Chilca was a rocket launch site in Peru at ,  near Lima. Chilca was in service from 1974 and 1983 and was mainly used for launching Arcas and Nike sounding rockets.

References 

Rocket launch sites
Transport buildings and structures in Peru

pt:Chilcas